Mary Berry (born 1935) is an English food writer and television presenter.

Mary Berry may also refer to:

 Mary Berry (conductor) (1917–2008), English canoness, choral conductor, and musicologist
 Mary Berry (writer, born 1763) (1763–1852), English writer
 Mary Fleetwood Berry (1865–1956), Irish suffragist
 Mary Frances Berry (born 1938), American historian and chair of the US Commission on Civil Rights
 "Mary Berry", a 2020 song by English rapper Niko B

See also
 Mary Barry (born 1955), Canadian singer
 Mary Gonzaga Barry (1834–1915), Irish Catholic religious sister